The Gorilla is a 1939 American horror comedy film starring the Ritz Brothers, Anita Louise, Art Miles, Lionel Atwill, Bela Lugosi, and Patsy Kelly. It was based on the 1925 play of the same name by Ralph Spence.

The film is in the public domain.

Plot

When a wealthy man (Lionel Atwill) is threatened by a killer known as The Gorilla, he hires the Ritz Brothers to investigate. A real escaped gorilla shows up at the mansion just as the investigators arrive. Patsy Kelly portrays a newly hired maid who wants to quit because the butler, played by Bela Lugosi, scares her.

Cast

Production
By October 1938, 20th Century Fox bought the rights to Ralph Spence's play The Gorilla. Fox wanted production on the film to start in January, which would be when The Ritz Brothers finished their tour. The studio wanted Kane Richmond to play a part in the film, but Richmond was replaced by Edward Norris after Richmond signed on for the film Charlie Chan in Reno. Fox signed on Bela Lugosi for the film as the butler. This character was originally meant for Peter Lorre.

The death of the Ritz Brothers' father caused production of the film in January to be delayed. Fox placed a $150,000 suit against the Ritz brothers for a breach of contract as the film was stated to start production on January 30, but was halted when the Ritz Brothers did not show up. By March, the film began shooting again with the Ritz brothers returning to the film. The Gorilla became the last film made for Fox by the Ritz brothers.

Release and reception

The Gorilla premiered on May 26, 1939. A negative review of the film was written in The New York Times stating, "It's all supposed to be either really funny or shockingly thrilling, depending on how you look at it. We couldn't see it either way." Describing the Ritz Brothers performance in the film as "perhaps best appreciated by those who find the antics of The Three Stooges to be of too high an order of wit," critic Craig Butler wrote in AllMovie that "shameless scenery chewing from Patsy Kelly ... can't distract from the baldness of some of the plot machinations or from the fact that many of the comic moments are shoehorned in with little rhyme or reason." Writing for Turner Classic Movies, critic Jeff Stafford described the film as "interesting primarily for Lugosi's tongue-in-cheek performance," but that the Ritz Brothers "come off like a poor man's version of The Marx Brothers," and that "Patsy Kelly's shrill performance as the terrified maid can also grate on your nerves."

See also
 List of films in the public domain in the United States

Notes

References

External links

 
 
 

1939 films
1939 horror films
1930s comedy horror films
American black-and-white films
1930s English-language films
Films about gorillas
Films directed by Allan Dwan
Films scored by David Raksin
Films set in country houses
American films based on plays
American comedy horror films
Articles containing video clips
1939 comedy films
1930s American films